Mikhail Tarasov, better known by his stage name Svoy (which can be loosely translated as "self-contained"), is an American producer/writer/artist for Universal Music Group in the genre of pop/electronica. He has seven self-produced albums and other records released via Mack Avenue Records/Sony Music Entertainment formerly known as Rendezvous Entertainment belonging to multi Grammy-nominated RIAA Gold-certified musician/media mogul Dave Koz and legendary radio chief executive/record producer Frank Cody, P-Vine Records/Blues Interactions, and Thistime Records.

Career

In 2004, Svoy won the BMI John Lennon Award for songwriters and received the award from Yoko Ono.

 In 2002, he won BMI Pete Carpenter Fellowship for film composers, that led to studying with multi Grammy and Emmy-winning composer Mike Post and Atli Orvarsson for one month at Post's studio in Los Angeles.

It was the Sony Music Publishing executive, Eric Beall, who oversaw Svoy’s career at the beginning. In 2005, when Svoy came to Beall’s office at the Sony Tower in New York City to play a self-recorded demo, Beall told him to send it not only to publishing companies as a songwriter/producer, but also to labels as an artist: “This is a finished record quality”, Beall stated. Svoy followed the advice and within a year got the recording and the publishing contract, all negotiated by New York attorney George Gilbert, also recommended by Beall. Frank Cody and Dave Koz felt the same way when heard the album – they made a decision to release it on Rendezvous/Universal “as is”. To this day, all of Svoy’s records are entirely self-produced.

In 2009, his single "Beautiful Thing" reached No. 69 on the Billboard Japan Hot TOP 100 Airplay and No. 82 on Billboard Japan Hot 100 Singles chart. Besides remaining in top 40 and 100 airplay charts of numerous major Japanese radio networks for over 8 weeks, the song peaked at No. 3 on Alpha Station FM Kyoto 89.4's TOP 40 Overseas Chart. Also in 2009, Svoy's album Automatons reached No. 100 on the Billboard Japan Top Independent Albums and Singles chart.

In 2011, Automatons and its title track were nominated for Best Dance/Electronica Album and Best Dance/Electronica Song at The 10th Independent Music Awards, and won in the latter category. He won the 10th IMA's Vox Populi in both categories. 10th Independent Music Awards judging panel included Seal, Fall Out Boy, Portishead, McCoy Tyner, Counting Crows, Aerosmith, Ozzy Osbourne, Suzanne Vega, Jesse Harris, Tom Waits, Aimee Mann, Jonatha Brooke among other artists and music industry professionals.

 In late 2012, Svoy collaborated on an electronic production/arrangement of a song with Grammy-winning singer-songwriter Meshell Ndegeocello and The Roots' bassist Mark Kelley for an upcoming album of jazz artist Claudia Acuna. In 2013, Svoy co-wrote a string arrangement with Kenny Garrett and made a vocalist appearance on Garrett’s multi Grammy-nominated albums, Pushing the World Away (2013) and Seeds from the Underground (2012), respectively. In 2016, Svoy collaborated with Garrett on an electronic jazz album and the record is awaiting release. Song "I'm Breaking", written by Eurovision Music Awards-winning songwriter Demir Demirkan and Svoy, was released as part of Demirkan's 2019 album Elysium on Ashes.

In 2015, aside from continuing to release regular studio albums, Svoy began work on ongoing experimental vocal electronic Symphony series and by 2019 has released five such pieces containing ten movements each.

Over the course of his career, Svoy has collaborated with Grammy-winning artists Kenny Garrett, Meshell Ndegeocello, Lenny White, Manuel Seal and Demir Demirkan, Claudia Acuna, Raul Midon, Adam Levy, Sergio Galoyan, Ilya Lagutenko, among other artists. Svoy is a voting member for The Recording Academy, a Yamaha Digital Artist, a Berklee College of Music and Gnessin Russian Academy of Music scholarship recipient/graduate.

 New York music critics Jack Rabid of The Big Takeover Magazine and Jesse Seilhan of TheCelebrityCafe.com describe Svoy as a "...Robot-driven repetitive-trance big-dance-rhythm cold synth-pop modern-chart soul futuristic electro-disco techno meister" and an artist who "...Is not afraid to explore" with Tower Records Japan dubbing him "...Electropop prince" and Timmy Kusnierek of YourEDM calling him "...One of the most accomplished experimental electronic artists", as well as his music "...An incredibly forward-thinking production that's beyond description". In addition, Meshell Ndegeocello described his music as "...Modern and moves".

In 2009, Svoy was granted a Green Card in the United States as an Alien of Extraordinary Ability and became a naturalized United States citizen in 2017. Svoy resides in New York City and Los Angeles.

Influences

As a pianist/composer, Svoy is influenced by Lyle Mays and Chick Corea among others, while some of his influences as a songwriter/producer are Peter Gabriel, Meshell Ndegeocello, Depeche Mode, Sting, Maxwell, Boards of Canada and Prefuse 73.

Personal life

Svoy is openly pansexual and identifies as an agnostic. He went to Berklee at the same time with Eric Andre, St. Vincent, Esperanza Spalding, Christian Scott, Mark Kelly, Hiromi among others and during the first semester was roommates with Ruslan Sirota.

Discography

Solo albums

Symphony albums

EPs

Compilations

Singles

Collaborations

Awards and nominations

References

External links
Official MySpace
Official website
Svoy on VH1
Svoy on MTV
Svoy on MTVU
Svoy on AOL Music
Svoy on Artist Direct
Svoy Gajoob Magazine Interview
Svoy Interview on IndependentMusicAwards.com

Russian electronic musicians
Russian pop musicians
Russian pop singers
Musicians from Vladivostok
Living people
1980 births
21st-century Russian singers